Gardenia resinosa is a species of plant in the family Rubiaceae native to northern Australia.

References

resinosa
Eudicots of Western Australia
Plants described in 1858
Taxa named by Ferdinand von Mueller